Color–flavor locking (CFL) is a phenomenon that is expected to occur in ultra-high-density strange matter, a form of quark matter. The quarks form Cooper pairs, whose color properties are correlated with their flavor properties in a one-to-one correspondence between three color pairs and three flavor pairs. According to the Standard Model of particle physics, the color-flavor-locked phase is the highest-density phase of three-flavor colored matter.

Color-flavor-locked Cooper pairing

This means that a Cooper pair of an up quark and a down quark must have colors red and green, and so on. This pairing pattern is special because it leaves a large unbroken symmetry group.

Physical properties

The CFL phase has several remarkable properties.
 It breaks chiral symmetry.
 It is a superfluid.
 It is an electromagnetic insulator, in which there is a "rotated" photon, containing a small admixture of one of the gluons.
 It has the same symmetries as sufficiently dense hyperonic matter.

There are several variants of the CFL phase, representing distortions of the pairing structure in response to external stresses such as a difference between the mass of the strange quark and the mass of the up and down quarks.

See also
 Color superconductivity

References

Quark matter
Quantum chromodynamics
Phases of matter